The following outline is provided as an overview of and topical guide to the U.S. state of Alaska:

Alaska – most extensive, northernmost, westernmost, highest, second newest, and least densely populated of the 50 states of the United States of America. Alaska occupies the westernmost extent of the Americas, bordering British Columbia and the Yukon, and is detached from the other 49 states. The summit of Denali (formerly Mount McKinley) at 6,194 meters (20,308 feet) is the highest point of North America.

General reference

 Names
 Common name: Alaska
 Pronunciation: 
 Official name: State of Alaska
 Abbreviations and name codes
 Postal symbol:  AK
 ISO 3166-2 code:  US-AK
 Internet second-level domain:  .ak.us
 Nicknames
 Great Land (previously used on license plates)
 Land of the Midnight Sun
 The Last Frontier (presently used on license plates)
Seward's Folly (named after U.S. Secretary of State William H. Seward)
Seward's Ice Box, Icebergia, Polaria, Walrussia, and Johnson's Polar Bear Garden were satirical names coined by members of the U.S. Congress during debate over the Alaska Purchase
 Adjectivals
 Alaska
 Alaskan
 Demonym: Alaskan

Geography of Alaska

Geography of Alaska
 Alaska is: a U.S. state, a federal state of the United States of America
 Location:  westernmost North America
 Northern and Western Hemisphere
 Americas
 North America
 Anglo America
 Northern America
 United States of America
 Alaska Time Zone
 Population of Alaska: 710,231 (2010 U.S. Census)
 Area of Alaska:
 Atlas of Alaska

Places in Alaska

Places in Alaska
 Historic places in Alaska
 Ghost towns in Alaska
 National Historic Landmarks in Alaska
 National Register of Historic Places listings in Alaska
 Bridges on the National Register of Historic Places in Alaska
 National Natural Landmarks in Alaska
 National parks in Alaska – see also List of areas in the United States National Park System.
 Denali National Park and Preserve
 Gates of the Arctic National Park and Preserve
 Glacier Bay National Park and Preserve
 Katmai National Park and Preserve
 Kenai Fjords National Park
 Kobuk Valley National Park
 Lake Clark National Park and Preserve
 Wrangell-St. Elias National Park and Preserve
 State parks in Alaska

Environment of Alaska
 Climate of Alaska
 Climate change in Alaska
 Protected areas in Alaska
 State forests of Alaska
 Superfund sites in Alaska
 Wildlife of Alaska
 Fauna of Alaska
 Birds of Alaska
 Mammals of Alaska

Geographic features of Alaska

Man-made geographic features of Alaska
 List of reservoirs and dams of Alaska
 Trans-Alaska Pipeline System

Natural geographic features of Alaska
 Islands of Alaska
 Lakes of Alaska
 Mountains of Alaska
 Mountain peaks of Alaska
 Highest mountain peaks of Alaska
 Volcanic craters in Alaska
 Rivers of Alaska
 Waterfalls in Alaska

Regions of Alaska
 Alaska Interior
 Alaska North Slope
 Alaska Panhandle
 Arctic Alaska
 Kenai Peninsula
 Matanuska-Susitna Valley
 Seward Peninsula
 Southcentral Alaska
 Southwest Alaska
 Alaska Peninsula
 Tanana Valley
 The Bush
 Yukon-Kuskokwim Delta

Administrative divisions of Alaska
 Boroughs and census areas of the state of Alaska
 Municipalities in Alaska
 Cities in Alaska
 State capital of Alaska: Juneau
 Largest city in Alaska: Anchorage (66th largest city in the United States)
 City nicknames in Alaska
 Native tribal entities
 Towns in Alaska

Boroughs of Alaska 

List of boroughs in Alaska
 Aleutians East Borough
 Anchorage
 Borough
 Bristol Bay Borough
 Fairbanks North Star Borough
 Haines Borough
 Juneau
 Kenai Peninsula Borough
 Ketchikan Gateway Borough
 Kodiak Island Borough
 Lake and Peninsula Borough
 Matanuska-Susitna Borough
 North Slope Borough
 Northwest Arctic Borough
 Sitka Borough
 Skagway Borough
 Unorganized Borough
 Wrangell
 Yakutat City and Borough

Demography of Alaska

Demographics of Alaska
 Alaska locations by per capita income

Government and politics of Alaska

Politics of Alaska
 Form of government: U.S. state government
 United States congressional delegations from Alaska
 Alaska State Capitol
 Elections in Alaska
 Electoral reform in Alaska
 Legal status of Alaska
 Political party strength in Alaska
 Political scandals
 Alaska political corruption probe

Branches of the government of Alaska

Government of Alaska

Executive branch of the government of Alaska
Governor of Alaska
Lieutenant Governor of Alaska
 State departments
 Alaska Department of Commerce, Community and Economic Development
 Alaska Department of Corrections
 Alaska Department of Health and Social Services
 Alaska Division of Juvenile Justice
 Alaska Permanent Fund
 Alaska Volcano Observatory
 Alaska Department of Education & Early Development
 Alaska Department of Fish and Game
 Alaska Department of Natural Resources
 Alaska Department of Transportation & Public Facilities
 Alaska Oil and Gas Conservation Commission
 Alaska State Medical Board
 Alaska State Pension Investment Board

Legislative branch of the government of Alaska
 Alaska Legislature (bicameral)
 Upper house: Alaska Senate
 Lower house: Alaska House of Representatives
 Alaska Legislative Council
 List of Alaska State Legislatures

Judicial branch of the government of Alaska

Courts of Alaska
 Alaska Court System
 Supreme Court of Alaska
 United States District Court for the District of Alaska
 List of United States federal courthouses in Alaska

Law and order in Alaska
 Cannabis in Alaska
 Capital punishment in Alaska: none. Alaska abolished the death penalty prior to statehood, eight men were executed by the earlier territorial government (1900–1959) and even earlier "Miner's Courts" executed a number of men in the 19th century. See also Capital punishment in the United States;  William Fentress Thompson and "Jerked to Jesus" (in regard to capital punishment and the early history of Fairbanks).
 Constitution of Alaska
 Crime in Alaska
 Gun laws in Alaska
 Law enforcement in Alaska
 Law enforcement agencies in Alaska
 Alaska State Troopers
 Penal system in Alaska
 Alaska Department of Corrections
 Prisons in Alaska
 Same-sex marriage in Alaska

Military in Alaska
 Alaska National Guard
 Alaska Air National Guard
 Alaska Army National Guard
 Alaska State Defense Force

Local government in Alaska 
 Assembly of the City and Borough of Juneau, Alaska

History of Alaska
History of Alaska

History of Alaska, by period 
 Prehistory of Alaska
 History of slavery in Alaska
 Russian Alaska, 1741 – 1867
 Great Northern Expedition, 1733 – 1743
 Spanish expeditions to Alaska, 1744 – 1791
 U.S. Department of Alaska, 1867 – 1884
 Alaska Purchase, treaty signed on March 30, 1867
 Gold mining in Alaska
 Klondike Gold Rush, 1896 – 1899
 Alaska boundary dispute, 1896 – 1903
 District of Alaska, 1884 – 1912
 Hay-Herbert Treaty, arbitration committee resolution occurred October 20, 1903
 Territory of Alaska, 1912 – 1959
 World War I, June 28, 1914 – November 11, 1918
 United States enters Great War on April 6, 1917
 Mount McKinley National Park established on February 26, 1917
 Serum run to Nome, January 26 - February 15, 1925
 World War II, September 1, 1939 – September 2, 1945
 Alaska World War II Army Airfields
 Alaska Defense Command established February 4, 1941
 United States enters Second World War on December 8, 1941
 Aleutian Islands Campaign, June 3, 1942 – August 15, 1943
 Alaska Highway completed 1942
 Alaskan Air Command established December 18, 1945
Operation Washtub (United States), active 1951-1959
State of Alaska becomes 49th state admitted to the United States of America on January 3, 1959
 Arctic National Wildlife Refuge established on December 6, 1960
 Good Friday earthquake of 1964
 Prudhoe Bay oil field discovered 1968
 Alaska Native Claims Settlement Act of 1971
 Trans-Alaska Pipeline System completed 1977
 Arctic National Wildlife Refuge drilling controversy since 1977
 Mount McKinley National Park incorporated into Denali National Park and Preserve on December 2, 1980
 Gates of the Arctic National Park and Preserve established on December 2, 1980
 Glacier Bay National Park and Preserve established on December 2, 1980
 Katmai National Park and Preserve established on December 2, 1980
 Kenai Fjords National Park established on December 2, 1980
 Kobuk Valley National Park established on December 2, 1980
 Lake Clark National Park and Preserve established on December 2, 1980
 Wrangell-Saint Elias National Park and Preserve established on December 2, 1980
 Arctic National Wildlife Refuge expanded on December 2, 1980
 Exxon Valdez oil spill of 1989

History of Alaska, by region 
 History of Anchorage, Alaska
 History of Fairbanks, Alaska

History of Alaska, by subject 
 History of aviation in Alaska
 History of slavery in Alaska

Culture of Alaska

Culture of Alaska
 Casinos in Alaska
 Hunting and fishing in Alaska
 Gardening in Alaska
 Museums in Alaska
 People of Alaska
 Natives of Alaska
 Religion in Alaska
 Cemeteries in Alaska
 Christianity in Alaska
 The Church of Jesus Christ of Latter-day Saints in Alaska
 Episcopal Diocese of Alaska
 Orthodox parishes in Alaska
 Scouting in Alaska

The arts in Alaska
 Alaska Native art
 Cinema in Alaska
 Alaska Film Archives
 Films set in Alaska
 Music of Alaska

Sports in Alaska

Sports in Alaska
 Alaska Sports Hall of Fame

State symbols of Alaska
State symbols of Alaska
State insignia
 Flag of the State of Alaska 
 Seal of the State of Alaska 
 State motto: "North to the Future"
 State bird: Willow ptarmigan, adopted by the Territorial Legislature in 1955. It is a small (15–17 inches) Arctic grouse that lives among willows and on open tundra and muskeg. Plumage is brown in summer, changing to white in winter. The willow ptarmigan is common in much of Alaska.
 State fish: King salmon, adopted 1962.
 State flower: Wild/native forget-me-not, adopted by the Territorial Legislature in 1917. It is a perennial that is found throughout Alaska, from Hyder to the Arctic Coast, and west to the Aleutians.
 State fossil: Woolly mammoth, adopted 1986.
 State gem: Jade, adopted 1968.
 State insect: Four-spot skimmer dragonfly, adopted 1995.
 State land mammal: Moose, adopted 1998.
 State marine mammal: Bowhead whale, adopted 1983.
 State mineral: Gold, adopted 1968.
 State song: "Alaska's Flag"
 State sport: Dog mushing, adopted 1972.
 State tree: Sitka spruce, adopted 1962.
 State dog: Alaskan Malamute, adopted 2010.
 State soil: Tanana, adopted unknown.

Economy and infrastructure of Alaska

Economy of Alaska
 Aquaculture in Alaska
 Commercial fishing in Alaska
 Alaskan king crab fishing
 Communications in Alaska
 Newspapers in Alaska
 Radio stations in Alaska
 Television stations in Alaska
 Energy in Alaska
 Natural gas in Alaska
 Power stations in Alaska
 Solar power in Alaska
 Trans-Alaska Pipeline System
 Wind power in Alaska
 Companies of Alaska
 Gold mining in Alaska
 Health care in Alaska
 Hospitals in Alaska

Transportation in Alaska 
Transportation in Alaska
 Government agencies
 Alaska Department of Transportation & Public Facilities
 Modes of transportation in Alaska
 Air transport in Alaska
 Airlines in Alaska
Alaska Airlines
Era Aviation
Frontier Flying Service
Pacific Alaska Airways
PenAir
 Airports in Alaska – major airports include:
Ted Stevens Anchorage International Airport
Fairbanks International Airport
Juneau International Airport
Ketchikan International Airport
 Bush flying in Alaska
 Marine transport in Alaska
Alaska Marine Highway System
Inside Passage
Port of Anchorage
Valdez oil terminal
 Bus travel in Alaska
 Areas operating local bus service
 Anchorage: People Mover
 Bethel
 Fairbanks: Metropolitan Area Commuter System
 Juneau: Capital Transit System
 Kenai
 Ketchikan
 Sitka – the Sitka Tribe of Alaska offers public bus transit in conjunction with the Alaska Department of Transportation.
 Rail transport in Alaska
 Railroads in Alaska
 Roads in Alaska
 Interstate Highways in Alaska
 State highways in Alaska
 Other modes of transportation in Alaska
 Mushing – transportation by dogsled.
 Dogsled
 Sled dog
 Off-road transportation
 All-terrain vehicle
 Snowmobile

Education in Alaska

Education in Alaska
 Schools in Alaska
 School districts in Alaska
 Middle schools in Alaska
 High schools in Alaska
 Higher education in Alaska
 College athletic programs in Alaska
 Colleges and universities in Alaska
 Alaska Pacific University, formerly Alaska Methodist University
 Sheldon Jackson College
 University of Alaska
 University of Alaska Anchorage
 University of Alaska Fairbanks
 University of Alaska Museum of the North
 University of Alaska Press
 University of Alaska Southeast
 Legal education in Alaska

See also

Topic overview:
Alaska

Index of Alaska-related articles

References

External links

 
 Alaska Community Database System
 Alaska's Digital Archives
 Alaska, project area of the American Land Conservancy
 Alaska Inter-Tribal Council
 
 Big, Beautiful Alaska – slideshow by Life magazine
 U.S. Government
 Energy & Environmental Data for Alaska
 USGS real-time, geographic, and other scientific resources of Alaska
 US Census Bureau
 Alaska State Facts
 Documents on Alaskan Statehood at the Dwight D. Eisenhower Presidential Library
 Guide to collections containing information on Alaskan statehood at the Eisenhower Presidential Library
 State government
 State of Alaska website
 Alaska State Databases – Annotated list of searchable databases produced by Alaska state agencies and compiled by the Government Documents Roundtable of the American Library Association.
 Alaska Department of Natural Resources, Recorder's Office

Alaska
Alaska
+